Pseudocercospora cannabina is a fungal plant pathogen infecting hemp.

References

External links 
 Index Fungorum
 USDA ARS Fungal Database

Fungal plant pathogens and diseases
Hemp diseases
cannabina
Fungi described in 1976